Dorothy Clara Louise Haas (29 April 1910 – 16 September 1994) was a German-American actress and singer who played in German and American films. After moving to the United States, she often appeared in Broadway plays. She became a naturalized US citizen and married Al Hirschfeld, a noted portraitist and caricaturist in New York City.

Life and work

Haas was born in Hamburg, Germany, to Charles Oswald Haas, a bookseller of British-German origin, and Margarete Maria (née Hansen). Haas was already an accomplished actress in German cinema before moving to the United States.

Her father Charles Haas was half-German, but had grown up in England, and had British citizenship. Dolly and her sister, Margarete, attended Jacob Loewenberg's girls' school Lyzeum in Hamburg, the Anerkannte höhere Mädchenschule.

Marriage and family
Haas married German-born film director John Brahm. At one time, he was resident director for acting troupes such as Deutsches Theater and the Lessing Theater, both in Berlin. They divorced.

After moving to the US, Haas became a naturalized U.S. citizen. She married again in 1943, to Al Hirschfeld in Baltimore, Maryland. They lived in New York, where he worked for The New York Times as a portraitist and caricaturist. His work was also published in the New York Review of Books. They had a daughter, Nina, born in 1945.

Career
Dolly Haas had her debut as a professional actress in 1927 in Berlin. She worked at the city's Großes Schauspielhaus theatre, before embarking on a film career. The latter took her to England and to Hollywood, United States.

Haas enjoyed a brief but successful stage career in the United States as well. She made her New York stage debut in 1941 in Erwin Piscator's production of The Circle of Chalk. She also performed with John Gielgud and Lillian Gish in the 1947 revival of Crime and Punishment.

In 1946 Haas followed Mary Martin in the lead role in Lute Song for the touring production. Her co-star, Yul Brynner, said that Haas's casting substantially improved the show. He said, "Dolly Haas understood the part. She had an affinity for it, and the play immediately improved. It wasn't at all that Dolly was a better actress. She was just better casting for the part than Mary."

Mary Martin agreed with Brynner's assessment, and helped Haas to prepare for the role in the short time allotted for rehearsal. Haas also performed in Off Broadway productions of The Threepenny Opera and Brecht on Brecht.

Although Haas did not appear in many English language films, she had an important role in Alfred Hitchcock's 1953 film, I Confess. Haas was a personal friend of Hitchcock, and he cast her as Alma Keller, the wife of the murderer—janitor Otto Keller. This high-profile film also starred Montgomery Clift, Anne Baxter, Karl Malden and Brian Aherne.

Death
Haas died 16 September 1994 from ovarian cancer in New York City, aged 84.

Filmography

 Dolly Gets Ahead (1930) - Dolly Klaren
 One Hour of Happiness (1931) - Die Puppe
  (1931) - Antoinette Kampf
 The Virtuous Sinner (1931) - Hedwig Pichlers-Tochter
  (1931) - Antonia
 You Don't Forget Such a Girl (1932) - Lisa Brandes
 Things Are Getting Better Already (1932) - Edith
 A Tremendously Rich Man (1932) - Dolly
 Scampolo (1932) - Scampolo
 Großstadtnacht (1932) - Madeleine Duchanef
 Das häßliche Mädchen (1933) - Lotte
 Die kleine Schwindlerin (1933) - Annette
 Little Girl, Great Fortune (1933) - Annie Schierke
 The Page from the Dalmasse Hotel (1933) - Friedel Bornemann
 Ein Mädel mit Tempo (1934) - Susanne 'Susi' Wegener - Tochter
 Girls Will Be Boys (1934) - Pat Caverley
 Warum lügt Fräulein Käthe? (1935) - Käthe Wilkens - Fotografin
 Broken Blossoms (1936) - Lucy
 Star for a Night (1936) - Chorine (uncredited)
 Spy of Napoleon (1936) - Eloise
 Carefree (1938) - Minor Role (uncredited)
 The Bank Dick (1940) - Script Girl (uncredited)
 Unfinished Business (1941) - Woman (uncredited)
 I Married an Angel (1942) - Infanta (uncredited)
 Du Barry Was a Lady (1943) - Miss April (uncredited)
 The Merry Widow (1952) - First Little Girl (uncredited)
 I Confess (1953) - Alma Keller
 Main Street to Broadway (1953) - Herself (uncredited)
 Armstrong Circle Theatre (1954, TV Series) - Sister Madeline
 Studio One (1950-1956, TV Series) - Mrs. Kneiper (final appearance)

References

External links

Photographs and literature

1910 births
1994 deaths
American film actresses
American musical theatre actresses
American television actresses
Deaths from cancer in New York (state)
Deaths from ovarian cancer
German women singers
German musical theatre actresses
German film actresses
German emigrants to the United States
Actresses from Hamburg
Musicians from Hamburg
20th-century German actresses
20th-century American actresses
20th-century American singers
20th-century German musicians
20th-century American women singers
Naturalized citizens of the United States